C-BZ (or cbz) may refer to:
 Cedric Bixler-Zavala, singer for At the Drive-In, The Mars Volta, Zavalaz, Antemasque
 Carbamazepine, an anticonvulsant and mood stabilizing drug
 Carboxybenzyl, a common amine protecting group in organic synthesis
 CBZ-FM, a CBC Radio 2 station in Fredericton, Canada
 CBZF-FM, a CBC Radio 1 station in Fredericton which had the call sign CBZ until 2004.
 CBZ Holdings, a financial services company of Zimbabwe
 .cbz, a file extension for the Comic Book Archive file format
 Hero Honda CBZ, a 4-stroke sports oriented bike by Hero Honda Motors India Ltd